Le Truel is a commune in the Aveyron department in southern France. The village was in the ancient province of Rouergue where they spoke in the rouergat patois of Occitan.

Geography
The commune is on the southern edge of the Massif Central. The commune is approached along the D200 which connects it to the A75 autoroute. The D200 runs alongside the Tarn which has been dammed and provides the power for two hydro-electric generating plants, Jourdanie and Le Pouget.

Economy
The economy is rural and traditionally was based on the raising of sheep to produce milk for sheep cheeses such as Roquefort. The agriculture has diversified into the raising of veal calves.

Barrage du Truel
The Tarn has been dammed there and electricity is generated by two Kaplan turbines producing 27 KW.

Le Pouget

Adjacent to the Barrage du Truel at 275 metres, is the Le Pouget power station. It is powered by waters from the Lévézou plateau delivered by penstocks from the Lac de Villefranche-de-Panat and the Lac de Saint-Amans both at 727 m. Le Pouget delivers 440 MW.

Population

Gallery

See also
Communes of the Aveyron department

References

Communes of Aveyron
Aveyron communes articles needing translation from French Wikipedia